"Machines" is a song by Scottish band Biffy Clyro, from their 2007 album, Puzzle. It was due to be released as the fourth physical single from Puzzle on 1 October 2007 but was pushed back one week and released on 8 October 2007.

The "Alternate Mix" was released on iTunes on 30 September, 1 day earlier than expected.

The "Rock Version" can only be bought at Recordstore.co.uk and also has alternate lyrics to the album version.

Overview
Simon Neil has commented on the song, saying:

Track listings
Songs and lyrics by Simon Neil. Music by Biffy Clyro.
CD 14FLR44CD, 5051442406672
"Machines (Chris Lord-Alge Mix)" - 3:54
"Hermaphrofight"
7" #1 14FLR27V1, 5051442406672
"Machines (Chris Lord-Alge Mix)" - 3:54
"Classical Machines (Remix)"
7" #2 14FLR27V2, 5051442406672
"Machines (Chris Lord-Alge Mix)" - 3:54
"Machines (Demo)"
 Digital download - Recordstore.co.uk exclusive
"Rock Machines"

Personnel
 Simon Neil – guitar, vocals
 James Johnston – bass, vocals
 Ben Johnston – drums, vocals
 Garth Richardson – producer
 Dorothy Lawson - cello
 Iain Cook – "Classical Machines" remixer
 Chris Lord-Alge - "Machines (Alternative Version)" mixer

Chart performance

Notes

Biffy Clyro songs
2007 singles
Albums with cover art by Storm Thorgerson
Songs written by Simon Neil
Song recordings produced by Garth Richardson
2007 songs
14th Floor Records singles